Robert Smith (20 June 1941 – 16 August 2019) was an English footballer who played as a left back and a winger.

Career
Smith began his career at hometown club Barnsley, making three Football League appearances for the club. In 1963, Smith signed for non-league club Chelmsford City. Over the course of ten years, Smith made 443 appearances for Chelmsford. Smith later played for Bexley United, before re-joining Chelmsford as part of their coaching staff.

References

1941 births
2019 deaths
Association football defenders
Association football wingers
English footballers
Footballers from Barnsley
Barnsley F.C. players
Chelmsford City F.C. players
Bexley United F.C. players
English Football League players
Chelmsford City F.C. non-playing staff
Association football coaches